Bulyk (Bulag) is a rural locality (a selo) in Dzhidinsky District, Republic of Buryatia, Russia. The population was 620 as of 2010. There are 6 streets.

Geography 
Bulyk is located 6 km southwest of Petropavlovka (the district's administrative centre) by road. Petropavlovka is the nearest rural locality.

References 

Rural localities in Dzhidinsky District